Vainupea is a village in Haljala Parish, Lääne-Viru County, in northern Estonia, on the territory of Lahemaa National Park. The village includes the island of Vaindloo, making it the northernmost settlement in Estonia.

Gallery

References

Villages in Lääne-Viru County